Nieuwerkerk is a submarine volcano in the Banda Sea, Indonesia. Along with the Emperor of China submarine volcano, the two twin forms a ridge (NEC ridge) on the seabed. The NEC ridge were dredged at depths ranging from 3,100–2,700 metres (10,170–8,858 ft).

See also 

 List of volcanoes in Indonesia

References 

Active volcanoes of Indonesia
Submarine volcanoes of Indonesia
Seamounts of the Banda Sea
Volcanoes of the Banda Sea